David C. Henderson was an American football player and coach of football and basketball.  He served as the head football coach at Kenyon College from 1946 to 1951 and at Allegheny College from 1952 to 1953, compiling a career college football record of 15–40–2.  Henderson was also the head basketball coach at Kenyon for four seasons, from 1948 to 1952, tallying a mark of 24–40.  He played football at the College of Wooster, from which he graduated in 1939.

Head coaching record

Football

References

Year of birth missing
Year of death missing
American football quarterbacks
Allegheny Gators football coaches
Kenyon Lords football coaches
Kenyon Lords basketball coaches
Wooster Fighting Scots football players